"Electrolite" is a song by R.E.M. released as their third single and closing track from their tenth studio album, New Adventures in Hi-Fi. The song is a piano-based ballad to Los Angeles, Hollywood icons and the closing 20th century. Initially, Michael Stipe objected to including the song on the album, but was won over by Peter Buck and Mike Mills. It has since become one of his favorite R.E.M. songs as well as one of Radiohead lead singer Thom Yorke's; Radiohead has covered the song.

The single was released on December 2, 1996, in the United Kingdom and on February 2, 1997, in the United States. Commercially, "Electrolite" reached the top 40 in Canada, Finland, Iceland and the United Kingdom but stalled at number 96 on the US Billboard Hot 100. The single's music video, directed by Peter Care and Spike Jonze, "involved dune buggies, crazy costumes, and rubber reindeer."

Composition

The piano line for the song was originally written by Mills in his apartment before bringing it to the band. The lyrics were composed by Stipe about the two-year period he spent living in Santa Monica and the trips he would take to people-watch on Mulholland Drive. During a June 21, 2008 performance in Atlanta, Georgia, Stipe mentioned that he was inspired to write the song after the 1994 Northridge earthquake. He told the audience that his home in L.A. was badly damaged and he went up Mulholland Drive and watched the lights from the city at night.

Like most of New Adventures in Hi-Fi, this song was recorded while on tour promoting Monster. This song was recorded by Joe O'Herlihy, Scott Litt, and Jo Ravitch during a soundcheck before their November 4, 1995 show in Phoenix, Arizona's Desert Sky Pavilion.

Lyrical content
In June 2006, the website of the Los Angeles Times featured an article on Mulholland Drive including excerpts from an essay Stipe wrote about the  highway:

"Mulholland represents to me the iconic 'from on high' vantage point looking down at L.A. and the valley at night when the lights are all sparkling and the city looks, like it does from a plane, like a blanket of fine lights all shimmering and solid. I really wanted to write a farewell song to the 20th century.

20th century go to sleep.
Really deep.
We won't blink.

"And nowhere seemed more perfect than the city that came into its own throughout the 20th century, but always looking forward and driven by ideas of a greater future, at whatever cost.

"Los Angeles.

"I name check three of the great legends of that single industry 'town,' as it likes to refer to itself. In order: James Dean, Steve McQueen, Martin Sheen. All iconic, all representing different aspects of masculinity—a key feature of 20th century ideology. It is the push me-pull you of a culture drawing on mid-century ideas of society, butt up against and in a great tug-of-war with modernism/rebirth/epiphany/futurism, wiping out all that that came before to be replaced by something 'better,' more civilized, more tolerant, fair, open, and so on ... [see 'reagan,' 'soylent green,' 'bladerunner,' current gubernatorial debates]

"The 'really deep' in the lyric is, of course, self-deprecating towards attempting at all, in a pop song, to communicate any level of depth or real insight.
"Mulholland is the place in films where you get a distance, and the awe, of the city built on dreams and fantasy. Far away enough to not smell it but to marvel at its intensity and sheer audacity. Kinda great.

"The title of the song came from flying into L.A. and/or seeing it from on high and it looking like a blanket of stars or those bizarre sea creatures that light up when you stir up the water. How I got 'electrolite' out of that I don't know, I still can't think of the word I was going for, but it is actually called 'phosphorescence' or 'bioluminescence.' I thought it was 'electro'- something, so I just used light/lyte, giving it the 'lite' of modern fad diet language."

During R.E.M.'s performance on VH1 Storytellers, Stipe introduced the song by saying: "I had a dentist in Los Angeles, who was also a dentist to Martin Sheen, and Martin Sheen was in the dentist's chair, getting his tooth drilled, when I went up to him and said, 'We have a record coming out in a couple of weeks and you're mentioned in one of the songs, and I just want you to know that it's honoring you; I don't want you to think that we're making fun of you.' And he was saying [impression of Sheen speaking with the dentist working on his mouth] 'Thank you very much!'. He was very nice about it."

Track listing
All songs written by Bill Berry, Peter Buck, Mike Mills and Michael Stipe.
"Electrolite" – 4:05
"The Wake-Up Bomb" (Live) – 5:07
"Binky the Doormat" (Live) – 5:01
"King of Comedy" (808 State remix) – 5:36

Live tracks were recorded at the Omni Coliseum, Atlanta Georgia on November 18, 1995. Taken from the live performance video, Road Movie.

Live versions
June 8, 1997, New York City
Mike Mills – drum machine, piano
Michael Stipe – vocals

October 27, 1998, London
Peter Buck – guitar
Scott McCaughey – keyboards
Mike Mills – piano
Michael Stipe – vocals
Ken Stringfellow – bass guitar
Joey Waronker – drums, percussion

July 19, 2003, Wiesbaden
Peter Buck – banjo
Scott McCaughey – guitar
Mike Mills – piano
Bill Rieflin – drums
Michael Stipe – vocals
Ken Stringfellow – bass guitar

October 7, 2003, New York City
Peter Buck – guitar
Scott McCaughey – keyboards
Mike Mills – piano
Bill Rieflin – drums, percussion
Michael Stipe – vocals
Ken Stringfellow – banjo

June 30 – July 5, 2007, Dublin
Peter Buck – guitar
Scott McCaughey – keyboards
Mike Mills – piano
Bill Rieflin – drums, percussion
Michael Stipe – vocals

March 13, 2008, Austin
Peter Buck – guitar
Scott McCaughey – bass guitar
Mike Mills – piano
Bill Rieflin – drums, percussion
Michael Stipe – vocals

Personnel

"Electrolite"
Bill Berry – drums, percussion
Peter Buck – banjo, guitar
Andy Carlson – violin
Nathan December – guiro
Mike Mills – piano, bass guitar
Michael Stipe – vocals

"The Wake-Up Bomb" (Live)
Bill Berry – drums
Peter Buck – guitar
Nathan December – guitar
Scott McCaughey – guitar, keyboards
Mike Mills – bass guitar, vocals
Michael Stipe – vocals

"Binky the Doormat" (Live)
Bill Berry – drums
Peter Buck – guitar
Nathan December – guitar
Scott McCaughey – guitar, keyboards
Mike Mills – bass guitar, vocals
Michael Stipe – vocals

"King of Comedy" (808 State Remix)
Bill Berry – drums
Peter Buck – guitar
Sally Dworsky – background vocals
Mike Mills – bass guitar, vocals
Michael Stipe – vocals

Charts

Weekly charts

Year-end charts

Release history

"Electrolite" was released as a single on 7-inch and 12-inch vinyl, cassette, and two-track and maxi-CD singles. The 7-inch, cassette, and two-track CD releases only contain "Electrolite" and "The Wake-Up Bomb" (Live).

The song was included in R.E.M.'s Warner Brothers greatest-hits compilation In Time: The Best of R.E.M. 1988–2003. The music video appears on the accompanying DVD In View: The Best of R.E.M. 1988–2003.

The public debut of the song was performed by Mills and Stipe on June 8, 1997 in New York City for the Tibetan Freedom Concert and released on Tibetan Freedom Concert. Another version recorded on October 27, 1998 for Later with Jools Holland in the BBC Television Centre in London was released as a b-side to "Suspicion" with a recording of "Man on the Moon" from the same performance. The July 19, 2003 performance also appears on the Perfect Square DVD. A version recorded live in-studio at Clinton Studios in New York City on October 7, 2003 was included in the promotional disc A Joyful Noise – In Time with R.E.M.; the promo includes several other songs from that session. R.E.M.'s performance from their 2005 Dublin rehearsals was released on the live album Live at The Olympia and their 2008 performance from Austin City Limits appears on R.E.M. Live from Austin, TX.

"Suspicion" single

A Joyful Noise – In Time with R.E.M.

References

External links
Lyrics from R.E.M. HQ
Full video on R.E.M. HQ's YouTube channel

1990s ballads
1996 singles
Music videos directed by Spike Jonze
R.E.M. songs
Rock ballads
Songs about California
Song recordings produced by Bill Berry
Song recordings produced by Michael Stipe
Song recordings produced by Mike Mills
Song recordings produced by Peter Buck
Song recordings produced by Scott Litt
Songs written by Bill Berry
Songs written by Peter Buck
Songs written by Michael Stipe
Songs written by Mike Mills
Warner Records singles
Folk rock songs
1996 songs
Songs about Los Angeles